Adnan Čaušević (born 10 January 1990) is a Norwegian footballer who plays as a defender for Finnsnes IL. Bosnian-born Adnan was granted Norway citizenship.

Čaušević was born in Prijedor. He played for Vard Haugesund before he joined Tromsø IL ahead of the 2013 season. After a decent stint there, he moved back south to play for Bryne.

In the summer of 2015 he went back to Vard, only to move to the city of Tromsø again in 2016. He signed for the nearby team Finnsnes.

Career statistics

References

External links 
 

1990 births
Living people
People from Prijedor
People from Haugesund
Norwegian footballers
Association football defenders
SK Djerv 1919 players
SK Vard Haugesund players
Tromsø IL players
Bryne FK players
Eliteserien players
Norwegian First Division players
Norwegian Second Division players
Bosnia and Herzegovina emigrants to Norway
Naturalised citizens of Norway